Events from the year 1679 in France

Incumbents
 Monarch – Louis XIV

Events
Treaties of Nijmegen
Treaty of Saint-Germain-en-Laye
Treaty of Fontainebleau

Births

Full date missing
Dominique Anel, surgeon (died 1730)
George Psalmanazar, imposter and writer (died 1763)

Deaths

Full date missing
Marie de Rohan, aristocrat (born 1600)
Jacques Cassagne, clergyman and poet (born 1636)
Jacques de Billy, mathematician (born 1602)
Pierre Lambert de la Motte, bishop (born 1624)
Guillaume Courtois, painter (born 1628)
Raymond Breton, Dominican missionary and linguist (born 1609)
François Combefis, Dominican patrologist (born 1605)

See also

References

1670s in France